Task Force 17 (TF17) was an aircraft carrier task force of the United States Navy during the Pacific Campaign of World War II. TF17 participated in several major carrier battles in the first year of the war.

With Yorktown, TF17 engaged Imperial Japanese Navy forces in actions at the Marshalls-Gilberts raids, Invasion of Lae-Salamaua, Battle of the Coral Sea, and the Battle of Midway. Yorktown was sunk at Midway.

At the Battle of the Santa Cruz Islands, Hornet was sunk. After the battle the task force ceased to exist, the remaining ships (the cruiser and destroyer escorts) were then dispersed to other duties.

References

Books

Web

United States Navy task forces
Battle of Midway